Crispiano is a railway station in Crispiano, Italy. The station is located on the Bari–Martina Franca–Taranto railway. The train services and the railway infrastructure are operated by Ferrovie del Sud Est.

Train services
The station is served by the following service(s):

Local services (Treno regionale) Martina Franca - Taranto

References

Railway stations in Apulia
Buildings and structures in the Province of Taranto